The No. 28 Squadron, nicknamed Phoenixes, is a multi-role fighter squadron from the No. 31 Air Superiority Wing of the Pakistan Air Force's Southern Air Command. It is currently deployed at Samungli Airbase in the Balochistan province and operates JF-17 Thunders.

History 

The No. 28 Squadron was raised on 28 February 2018 at Samungli Airbase. A special ceremony was organized for this event which then COAS Air Chief Marshal Sohail Aman himself attended along with other high-ranking officials. The Squadron was equipped with JF-17 Thunders and Wing Commander Amir Imran Cheema was appointed as its first Officer Commanding. Moreover, it was tasked with providing aerial protection to Pakistan's western borders with Iran and particularly Afghanistan besides protecting CPEC and other infrastructural development projects from foreign threats.

Operational History

Foreign Deployments 
In 2019, the squadron saw its first foreign deployment to Turkey as part of Exercise Anatolian Eagle during which a number of its JF-17s were sent to Konya Air Base.

See also 
 List of Pakistan Air Force Squadrons

References 

Pakistan Air Force squadrons